Yat or jat (Ѣ ѣ; italics: Ѣ ѣ) is  the thirty-second letter of the old Cyrillic alphabet and the Rusyn alphabet.

There is also another version of yat, the iotified yat (majuscule: ,), which is a Cyrillic character combining a decimal I and a yat. There was no numerical value for this letter and it was not in the Glagolitic alphabet. It was encoded in Unicode 5.1 at positions U+A652 and U+A653.

Usage 
Yat represented a Common Slavic long vowel. That the sound represented by yat developed late in the history of Common Slavic is indicated by its role in the Slavic second palatalization of the Slavic velar consonants.

The confusion was also possibly aggravated by Cyrillic Little Yus  looking very similar to the older Glagolitic alphabet's yat . An extremely rare "iotated yat" form  also exists, documented only in Svyatoslav's Izbornik from 1073.

Standard reflexes 

In various modern Slavic languages, yat has reflected into various vowels. For example, the old Slavic root bělъ | бѣлъ (white) became:

бел  in Standard Russian (dialectal ,  or even  in some regions) 
біл  in Ukrainian and Rusyn
бел  in Belarusian
бял / бели  in Bulgarian (бел / бели in Western dialects) 
бел  in Macedonian 
beo / beli in Kajkavian, Ekavian forms of Serbo-Croatian (Genitive belog / beloga)
bil / bili in Ikavian forms of Serbo-Croatian
 bijel / bijeli in Ijekavian forms of Serbo-Croatian (Genitive bijelog / bijeloga) 
bel / beli in Slovenian
biel / biały in Polish 
běl / bílý in Czech
biel / biely in Slovak.

Other reflexes
Other reflexes of yat exist; for example:
Proto-Slavic телѣга became таљиге (taljige; ѣ > i reflex) in Serbo-Croatian.
Proto-Slavic орѣхъ became орах (orah; ѣ > a reflex) in Serbo-Croatian.

Confusion with other letters
Due to these reflexes, yat no longer represented an independent phoneme but an already existing one, represented by another Cyrillic letter. As a result, children had to memorize by rote whether or not to write yat. Therefore, the letter was dropped in a series of orthographic reforms: in Serbian with the reform of Vuk Karadžić, in Ukrainian-Ruthenian with the reform of Panteleimon Kulish, later in Russian and Belarusian with the Bolshevik reform in 1918, and in Bulgarian and Carpathian dialects of Ruthenian language as late as 1945.

The letter is no longer used in the standard modern orthography of any of the Slavic languages written with the Cyrillic script, but survives in Ukrainian (Ruthenian) liturgical and church texts of Church Slavonic in Ruthenian (Ukrainian) edition and in some  written in the Russian recension of Church Slavonic. It has, since 1991, found some favor in advertising to deliberately invoke an archaic or "old-timey" style.

Bulgarian

In Bulgarian the different reflexes of the yat form the so-called yat border (ятова граница), running approximately from Nikopol on the Danube to Solun (Thessaloniki) on the Aegean Sea. The division of the dialects of the Eastern South Slavic into western and eastern subgroup running along the yat border is the most important dividing isogloss there.

Some older Serbian scholars believed that the yat border divides the Serbian and Bulgarian languages. However, modern Serbian linguists such as Pavle Ivic have accepted that the main isoglosses bundle dividing Eastern and Western South Slavic runs from the mouth of the Timok river alongside Osogovo mountain and Sar Mountain. On the other hand, in Bulgaria the Timok-Osogovo-Sar isogloss is considered the eastern most border of the broader set of the transitional Torlakian dialects, described often as part of the Eastern South Slavic, (i.e. Bulgarian/Macedonian). Jouko Lindstedt has assumed that the dividing line between the Macedonian language, codified after WWII, and Bulgarian is in fact the yat border. It divides also the modern region of Macedonia running along the Velingrad – Petrich – Thessaloniki line.

In 1870 Marin Drinov, who played a decisive role in the standardization of the Bulgarian language, rejected the proposal of Parteniy Zografski and Kuzman Shapkarev for a mixed eastern and western Bulgarian/Macedonian foundation of the standard Bulgarian language. This was regarded as a way to maintain unity between Eastern and Western Bulgarians, as much of what was then, and is now, seen as Western Bulgarian dialects were in the Late Middle Ages partially under Serbian control. In 1945 the Yat-letter was removed from the Bulgarian alphabet and the spelling was changed to conform to the Eastern pronunciation. Some examples of the alternation in the standard language follow:

 мляко (milk) [n.]  → млекар (milkman); млечен (milky), etc.
 сядам (sit) [vb.] → седалка (seat); седалище (seat, e.g. of government), etc.
 свят (world) [n.] → световен (worldly); светски (secular), etc.

Russian

In Russian, written confusion between the yat and  appears in the earliest records; when exactly the distinction finally disappeared in speech is a topic of debate. Some scholars, for example W. K. Matthews, have placed the merger of the two sounds at the earliest historical phases (the 11th century or earlier), attributing its use until 1918 to Church Slavonic influence. Within Russia itself, however, a consensus has found its way into university textbooks of historical grammar (e.g., V. V. Ivanov), that, taking all the dialects into account, the sounds remained predominantly distinct until the 18th century, at least under stress, and are distinct to this day in some localities.

The story of the letter yat and its elimination from the Russian alphabet makes for an interesting footnote in Russian cultural history. See Reforms of Russian orthography for details. A full list of words that were written with the letter yat at the beginning of 20th century can be found in the Russian Wikipedia.

A few inflections and common words were distinguished in spelling by  /  (for example: ѣсть / есть  "to eat" / "(there) is"; лѣчу / лечу  "I heal" / "I fly"; синѣ́е / си́нее ,  "bluer" / "blue" (n.); вѣ́дѣніе / веде́ніе ,  "knowledge" / "leadership").

Its retention without discussion in the Petrine reform of the Russian alphabet of 1708 indicates that it then still marked a distinct sound in the Moscow koiné of the time.

Calls for the elimination of yat from the Russian spelling began with Trediakovsky in the 18th century. A proposal for spelling reform from the Russian Academy of Science in 1911 included, among other matters, the systematic elimination of the yat, but was declined at the highest level. According to Lev Uspensky's popular linguistics book A Word On Words (Слово о словах), yat was "the monster-letter, the scarecrow-letter ... which was washed with the tears of countless generations of Russian schoolchildren". (This book was published in the Soviet period, and accordingly it expressed strong support towards the 1918 reform.) The schoolchildren had to memorize very long nonsense verses made up of words with :

The spelling reform was promulgated by the Provisional Government in the summer of 1917. However, it was not implemented under the prevailing conditions. After the Bolshevik Revolution, the new regime wanted to differentiate itself from the "hated past", and took up the Provisional Drafts, implementing them with some major deviations. Even in the Soviet Union, it is said that some printing shops continued to use the eliminated letters until their blocks of type were forcibly removed; certainly, the Academy of Sciences published its annals in the old orthography until approximately 1924, and the Russian Orthodox Church, when printing its calendar for 1922, for the first time in the new orthography, included a note that it was doing so because otherwise they would not have received the permission from the Soviet government. To the builders of the new regime, conversely, the new spelling visibly denoted the shining world of the future, and marked on paper the break with the old. The large-scale campaign for literacy in the early years of the Soviet government was, of course, conducted in accordance with the new norms.

According to critics of the Bolshevik reform, the choice of Ии as the only letter to represent that side and the removal of Іі defeated the purpose of 'simplifying’ the language, as Ии occupies more space and, furthermore, is sometimes indistinguishable from Шш.

The reform also created many homographs and homonyms, which used to be spelled differently. Examples: есть/ѣсть (to be/eat) and миръ/міръ (peace/the Universe) became есть and мир in both instances.

In objective terms, the elimination of the yat, together with the other spelling reforms, decisively broke the influence of Church Slavonic on the living literary language.

After the dissolution of the Soviet Union, as a tendency occasionally to mimic the past appeared in Russia, the old spelling became fashionable in some brand names and the like, as archaisms, specifically as "sensational spellings". For example, the name of the business newspaper Kommersant appears on its masthead with a word-final hard sign, which is superfluous in modern orthography: "Коммерсантъ".  Calls for the reintroduction of the old spelling were heard, though not taken seriously, as supporters of the yat described it as "that most Russian of letters", and the "white swan" (бѣлый лебедь) of Russian spelling.

Ukrainian

This corresponds more with the Russian pronunciation of yat rather than actual word etymologies. The modern Ukrainian letter  has the same phonetic function. Several Ukrainian orthographies with the different ways of using yat and without yat co-existed in the same time during the 19th century, and most of them were discarded before the 20th century. After the middle of the 19th century, orthographies without yat dominated in the Eastern part of Ukraine, and after the end of the 19th century they dominated in Galicia.

New yat is not related to the Proto-Slavic yat, but it has frequently been represented by the same sign.

Rusyn
In Rusyn, yat was used until 1945. In modern times, some Rusyn writers and poets try to reinstate it, but this initiative is not really popular among Rusyn intelligentsia.

Romanian
In the old Romanian Cyrillic alphabet, the yat, called eati, was used as the  diphthong. It disappeared when Romanian adopted the transitional alphabet, first in Wallachia, then in Moldova.

Serbo-Croatian

In the Štokavian and Čakavian vowel systems, this phoneme lost a back vowel parallel; the tendency towards articulatory symmetry led to its merging with other phonemes.

On the other hand, most Kajkavian dialects did have a back vowel parallel (a reflex of *ǫ and *l̥), and both the front and back vowels were retained in most of these dialects' vowel system before merging with a reflex of a vocalized Yer (*ь). Thus the Kajkavian vowel system has a symmetry between front and back closed vocalic phonemes: */ẹ/ (< */ě/, */ь/) and */ọ/ (< */ǫ/, */l̥/).

Čakavian dialects utilized both possibilities of establishing symmetry of vowels by developing Ikavian and Ekavian reflexes, as well as "guarding the old yat" at northern borders (Buzet dialect). According to yat reflex Čakavian dialects are divided to Ikavian (mostly South Čakavian), Ekavian (North Čakavian) and mixed Ikavian-Ekavian (Middle Čakavian), in which mixed Ikavian-Ekavian reflex is conditioned by following phonemes according to the Jakubinskij's law (e.g. sled : sliditi < PSl. *slědъ : *slěditi; del : diliti < *dělъ : *děliti). Mixed Ikavian-Ekavian Čakavian dialects have been heavily influenced by analogy (influence of nominative form on oblique cases, infinitive on other verbal forms, word stem onto derivations etc.). The only exception among Čakavian dialects is Lastovo island and the village of Janjina, with Jekavian reflex of yat.

The most complex development of yat has occurred in Štokavian, namely Ijekavian Štokavian dialects which are used as a dialectal basis for modern standard Serbo-Croatian variants, and that makes the reflexes of yat one of the central issues of Serbo-Croatian orthoepy and orthography. The position of this diphthong is equally unstable as that of closed *, which has led to its dephonologization. Short diphthong has thus turned to diphonemic sequence , and long to disyllabic (triphonemic) , but that outcome is not the only one in Štokavian dialects, so the pronunciation of long yat in Neo-Štokavian dialects can be both monosyllabic (diphthongal or triphthongal) and disyllabic (triphonemic). However, that process has been completed in dialects which serve as a dialectal basis for the orthographical codification of Ijekavian Serbo-Croatian. In writing, the diphthong  is represented by the trigraph  – this particular inconsistency being a remnant of the late 19th century codification efforts, which planned to redesign common standard language for Croats and Serbs. This culminated in the Novi Sad agreement and "common" orthography and dictionary. Digraphic spelling of a diphthong as e.g. was used by some 19th-century Croat writers who promoted so-called "etymological orthography" – in fact morpho-phonemic orthography which was advocated by some Croatian philological schools of the time (Zagreb philological school), and which was even official during the brief period of the fascist Independent State of Croatia (1941–1945).

Dephonologization of diphthongal yat reflex could also be caused by assimilation within diphthong  itself: if the first part of a diphthong assimilates secondary part, so-called secondary Ikavian reflex develops; and if the second part of a diphthong assimilates the first part secondary Ekavian reflex develops. Most Štokavian Ikavian dialects of Serbo-Croatian are exactly such – secondary Ikavian dialects, and from Ekavian dialects secondary are the Štokavian Ekavian dialects of Slavonian Podravina and most of Serbia. They have a common origin with Ijekavian Štokavian dialects in a sense of developing yat reflex as diphthongal reflex. Some dialects also "guard" older yat sound, and some reflexes are probably direct from yat.

Direct Ikavian, Ekavian and mixed reflexes of yat in Čakavian dialects are a much older phenomenon, which has some traces in written monuments and is estimated to have been completed in the 13th century. The practice of using old yat phoneme in Glagolitic and Bosnian Cyrillic writings in which Serbo-Croatian was written in the centuries that followed was a consequence of conservative scribe tradition. Croatian linguists also speak of two Štokavians, Western Štokavian (also called Šćakavian) which retained yat longer, and Eastern Štokavian which "lost" yat sooner, probably under (western) Bulgarian influences.
Areas which bordered Kajkavian dialects mostly retained yat, areas which bordered Čakavian dialects mostly had secondary Ikavisation, and areas which bordered (western) Bulgarian dialects mostly had secondary Ekavisation. "Core" areas remained Ijekavian, although western part of the "core" became monosyllabic for old long yat.

Reflexes of yat in Ijekavian dialects are from the very start dependent on syllable quantity. As it has already been said, standard Ijekavian Serbo-Croatian writes trigraph  at the place of old long yat, which is in standard pronunciation manifested disyllabically (within Croatian standard monosyllabic pronunciation), and writes  at the place of short yat. E.g. bijȇl < PSl. *bělъ, mlijéko < *mlěko < by liquid metathesis from *melkò, brijȇg < *brěgъ < by liquid metathesis from *bȇrgъ, but mjȅsto < *mě̀sto, vjȅra < *vě̀ra, mjȅra < *mě̀ra. E.g. grijati < *grějati, sijati < *sějati, bijaše < *bějaše; but htio : htjela < *htělъ : *htěla, letio : letjela (< *letělъ : *letěla). The standard language also allows some doublets to coexist, e.g. cȉo and cijȇl < *cě̑lъ, bȉo and bijȇl < *bě́lъ.

In modern standard Ijekavian Serbo-Croatian varieties syllables that carry yat reflexes are recognized by alternations in various inflected forms of the same word or in different words derived from the same stem. These alternating sequences ije/je, ije/e, ije/i, ije/Ø, je/i, je/ije, e/ije, e/je, i/ije are dependent on syllable quantity. Beside modern reflexes they also encompass apophonic alternations inherited from Proto-Slavic and Indo-European times, which were also conditioned by quantitative alternations of root syllable, e.g. ùmrijēti – ȕmrēm, lȉti – lijévati etc. These alternations also show the difference between the diphthongal syllables with Ijekavian reflex of yat and syllables with primary phonemic sequence of ije, which has nothing to do with yat and which never shows alternation in inflected forms, e.g. zmìje, nijèdan, òrijent etc.

Computing codes

See also
 Ѧ ѧ :Yus
 Ҍ ҍ : Cyrillic letter Semisoft sign
 Ә ә : Cyrillic schwa, used in Turkic languages and Kalmyk to transcribe the near-open front unrounded vowel (/æ/)
 Ӓ ӓ : Cyrillic letter A with diaeresis, used in Mari to transcribe the near-open front unrounded vowel (/æ/)
 Ě ě : Latin letter E with caron - a Czech and Sorbian letter

References

Further reading
 

History of the Bulgarian language